A maraca, sometimes called shaker or chac-chac, is a rattle which appears in many genres of Caribbean and Latin music. It is shaken by a handle and usually played as part of a pair.

Maracas (from Guaraní ), also known as tamaracas, were rattles of divination, an oracle of the Brazilian Tupinamba people, found also with other Indigenous ethnic groups, such as the Guarani, Orinoco and in Florida. Rattles made from Lagenaria gourds are being shaken by the natural grip, while the round Crescentia calabash fruits are fitted to a handle. Human hair is sometimes fastened on the top, and a slit is cut in it to represent a mouth, through which their shamans (payes) made it utter its responses. Every man had his maraca. It was used at their dances and to heal the sick. Andean curanderos (healers) use maracas in their healing rites.

Modern maraca balls are also made of leather, wood or plastic.

Gallery

References

External links

Venezuelan musical instruments
South American percussion instruments
Central American and Caribbean percussion instruments
Orchestral percussion instruments
Vessel rattles
Hand percussion
Unpitched percussion instruments